The 2020 UEFA Women's Under-19 Championship qualifying competition was a women's under-19 football competition that was originally to determine the seven teams joining the automatically qualified hosts Georgia in the 2020 UEFA Women's Under-19 Championship final tournament, before being cancelled due to the COVID-19 pandemic in Europe.

Apart from Georgia, 48 of the remaining 54 UEFA member national teams entered the qualifying competition. Players born on or after 1 January 2001 were eligible to participate.

Format
The qualifying competition was planned to consist of two rounds:
Qualifying round: The 48 teams were drawn into twelve groups of four teams. Each group was played in single round-robin format at one of the teams selected as hosts after the draw. The twelve group winners, the twelve runners-up, and the four third-placed teams with the best record against the first and second-placed teams in their group would have advanced to the elite round.
Elite round (cancelled): The 28 teams were drawn into seven groups of four teams. Each group would have been played in single round-robin format at one of the teams selected as hosts after the draw. The seven group winners would have qualified for the final tournament.

The schedule of each group was planned as follows, with two rest days between each matchday (Regulations Article 20.04):

Tiebreakers
In the qualifying round and planned elite round, teams were ranked according to points (3 points for a win, 1 point for a draw, 0 points for a loss), and if tied on points, the following tiebreaking criteria were applied, in the order given, to determine the rankings (Regulations Articles 14.01 and 14.02):
Points in head-to-head matches among tied teams;
Goal difference in head-to-head matches among tied teams;
Goals scored in head-to-head matches among tied teams;
If more than two teams are tied, and after applying all head-to-head criteria above, a subset of teams were still tied, all head-to-head criteria above were reapplied exclusively to this subset of teams;
Goal difference in all group matches;
Goals scored in all group matches;
Penalty shoot-out if only two teams had the same number of points, and they met in the last round of the group and were tied after applying all criteria above (not used if more than two teams had the same number of points, or if their rankings were not relevant for qualification for the next stage);
Disciplinary points (red card = 3 points, yellow card = 1 point, expulsion for two yellow cards in one match = 3 points);
UEFA coefficient ranking for the qualifying round draw;
Drawing of lots.

To determine the four best third-placed teams from the qualifying round, the results against the teams in fourth place were discarded. The following criteria were applied (Regulations Article 15.01):
Points;
Goal difference;
Goals scored;
Disciplinary points (total 3 matches);
UEFA coefficient ranking for the qualifying round draw;
Drawing of lots.

Qualifying round

Draw
The draw for the qualifying round was held on 23 November 2018, 10:00 CET (UTC+1), at the UEFA headquarters in Nyon, Switzerland.

The teams were seeded according to their coefficient ranking, calculated based on the following:
2015 UEFA Women's Under-19 Championship final tournament and qualifying competition (qualifying round and elite round)
2016 UEFA Women's Under-19 Championship final tournament and qualifying competition (qualifying round and elite round)
2017 UEFA Women's Under-19 Championship final tournament and qualifying competition (qualifying round and elite round)
2018 UEFA Women's Under-19 Championship final tournament and qualifying competition (qualifying round and elite round)

Each group contained one team from Pot A, one team from Pot B, one team from Pot C, and one team from Pot D. Based on the decisions taken by the UEFA Emergency Panel, the following pairs of teams could not be drawn in the same group: Russia and Ukraine, Azerbaijan and Armenia, Serbia and Kosovo, Bosnia and Herzegovina and Kosovo.

Groups
The qualifying round was provisionally scheduled between 27 August and 3 September, or 1 and 8 October 2019.

Times are CEST (UTC+2), as listed by UEFA (local times, if different, are in parentheses).

Group 1

Group 2

Group 3

Group 4

Group 5

Group 6

Group 7

Group 8

Group 9

Group 10

Group 11

Group 12

Ranking of third-placed teams
To determine the four best third-placed teams from the qualifying round which advance to the elite round, only the results of the third-placed teams against the first and second-placed teams in their group are taken into account.

Elite round (cancelled)

Draw
The draw for the elite round was held on 29 November 2019, 11:00 CET (UTC+1), at the UEFA headquarters in Nyon, Switzerland.

The teams were seeded according to their results in the qualifying round. Each group contained one team from Pot A, one team from Pot B, one team from Pot C, and one team from Pot D. Winners and runners-up from the same qualifying round group could not be drawn in the same group, but the best third-placed teams could be drawn in the same group as winners or runners-up from the same qualifying round group.

Groups
The elite round was originally scheduled to be played between 7–14 April 2020. On 12 March 2020, UEFA announced that the elite round had been postponed due to the COVID-19 pandemic in Europe. UEFA announced on 1 April 2020 that the tournament had been cancelled.

Times are CEST (UTC+2), as listed by UEFA (local times, if different, are in parentheses).

Group 1

Group 2

Group 3

Group 4

Group 5

Group 6

Group 7

Goalscorers
In the qualifying round,

References

External links

Women's Under-19 Matches: 2020 Qualifying, UEFA.com

Qualification
2020
2019 in women's association football
2020 in women's association football
2019 in youth association football
2020 in youth association football
October 2019 sports events in Europe
Association football events curtailed due to the COVID-19 pandemic